The TREMEC TR-3650 is a 5-speed manual transmission for longitudinal engine automobiles. It includes a 5th gear that functions as an overdrive gear, light-weight aluminum housings, a synchromesh reverse gear, and synchromeshed helical cut forward gears. The loss in power transmission efficiency is rated at approximately 16% in 4th gear for a 2005–2010 Ford Mustang GT.

Gear Ratios
TR-3650 used in the 2001-2004 Ford Mustang GT

1st: 3.380:1
2nd: 2.000:1
3rd: 1.320:1
4th: 1.000:1
5th: 0.670:1 (used in 2001 with GT, Bullitt and Cobra)
5th: 0.620:1 (used in 02-04 with GT and Mach 1)
Rev: 3.380:1

Note that in the other TR-3650 applications, the 5th gear ratio is also available with 0.68(05-10 with 3.55:1 final drive) and 0.74.

In 2002 Ford Australia's vehicle were fitted with the following ratios:

1st 3.37:1
2nd 2.00:1
3rd 1.32:1
4th 1.00:1
5th 0.62:1
Reverse 3.77:1

Recommended Oil and Fill Capacity
TREMEC engineers have recommended Texaco-Havoline Dexron III/Mercon Non-Synthetic ATF. There has been a significant amount of confusion regarding the proper capacity and proper type of ATF for the TR-3650 which may have a correlation with a rather large number of complaints about notchy shifting, shift "nibbling", noisy synchros, and grinding gears. The 2007 Mustang GT owner's manual specified the use of 3.0 L of non-synthetic Mercon ATF in the 3650, while the 2008 Mustang GT owner's manual now specifies the use of 3.0 L of Mercon-V ATF in the 3650. Dexron III/Mercon Non-Synthetic ATF seems to 
work best for pre-2005 Mustang GTs.
NB: Tremec service manual also specifies Mobil 1 Synthetic ATF ( Tremec specification ET-M-99 ) in addition to Dexron III.

Note that Tremec engineers have also recommended GM Synchromesh as the transmission fluid.

Note Mal Wood Automotive, an official authorised Tremec distributor in Australia, have consistently recommended use of Castrol Transmax Z for use in the Australia Ford vehicles.

Applications
 2001 Ford Mustang Cobra, top-loading shifter.
 2001 Ford Mustang Bullitt
 2001-2004 Ford Mustang GT, top-loading shifter.
 2002 Ford Tickford Experience AU Series 3 TE50
 2002 Ford Tickford Experience AU Series 3 TS50
 2002 Ford AU Series 3 Falcon XR8 Pursuit 250
 2003-2004 Ford Mustang Mach 1
 2002-2003 Ford Falcon BA
 2003-2005 MG ZT 260
 2005–2010 Ford Mustang GT, Bullitt, remote mounted shifter (TCET5757)

References

External links
 Official page
 roadandtrack.com Mustang data

3650